The Halesowen Chronicle is a free local newspaper which serves the Halesowen area of the West Midlands in England.  It is published by Midland News Association.

Halesowen
Newspapers published in the West Midlands (county)
Free newspapers